NTV, an acronym of less commonly used National Television, is a Bangladeshi Bengali-language satellite and cable television channel based in the BSEC Building in Karwan Bazar, Dhaka. It was launched on 2 July 2003, and is one of Bangladesh's most popular television channels. NTV is owned by International Television Channel Limited, with Mosaddek Ali Falu, a businessman and former vice president of the Bangladesh Nationalist Party, being the channel's chairman.

History
On 10 February 2003, NTV was announced to set operations in April of that year, as Bangladesh's previous privately owned television channel, Ekushey Television was shut down in 2002. It had also announced a partnership with CNN. However, its official broadcasts started on 3 July 2003. In 2004, Falu bought NTV and pushed its license approval further.

In August 2006, the United Kingdom-based NTV Europe was launched and targeted the Bangladeshi community throughout Europe on Sky channel 826, but stopped broadcasting a year later. On 26 February 2007, a massive fire took place at the BSEC building in Karwan Bazar, killing three people and injuring over a hundred. As a result, both NTV and its sister, RTV, temporarily ceased operations and forced the channel to broadcast reruns after resuming broadcasts. They worked with Banglavision to broadcast their news onto NTV since they were unable to do their own. NTV Europe was relaunched on Sky channel 834 in the United Kingdom in August 2008.

In September 2011, NTV became the first television channel in Bangladesh to receive an ISO certificate for its contribution to its broadcast management. Mike Bloise handed it to the channel's chairman, Falu. On 14 April 2012, NTV Europe was replaced by Channel 9 on Sky channel 834. However, NTV Europe started broadcasting on Sky channel 852 sixteen days later., but due to a reshuffle, it moved to channel 838 on 19 August 2014.

On 31 October 2014, another fire broke out in the BSEC building on 11:48 at morning, which once again led to the shut down of both NTV and RTV. NTV resumed transmissions later on that day. In 2016, Falu resigned from the Bangladesh Nationalist Party as vice chairman. NTV was one of the nine Bangladeshi television channels to sign an agreement with Bdnews24.com to subscribe to a video-based news agency run by children called Prism in May 2016. NTV aired the Miss World Bangladesh pageant in 2017. On 1 May 2018, as a part of another reshuflle, NTV Europe moved to Sky channel 757 due to the fact that the International genre had started to begin at channel 701. NTV's old slot was used for Lifetime. It was moved again to channel 780 due to Sky's reshuffle of its international section by language in 2019. In December 2018, NTV began broadcasting using the Bangabandhu-1 satellite. On 26 February 2019, the second anime series of Chibi Maruko-chan, dubbed in Bengali, premiered on NTV.

Recently NTV authority has taken an initiative to promote its website. As a result, NTV online has been started its journey more elaborately to keep people updated about latest news, entertainment program, sports, tech, travel, automobile, lifestyle, education and so on.

Programming
NTV's programming is diverse and consists of news coverage, soap operas, edutainment, religious, and political programs.

Drama
 111: A Nelson Number (2007–2008)
 Aim in Life (2008–2009)
 Bhalobasha Kare Koy (2018–2019)
 Family Crisis (2019-2021)
 Family Friends (2022)
 Fnf (2010)
 Golpogulo Amader (2017–2018)
 Hawai Mithai (2020–2021)
 House 44 (2015)
 House Full (2008–2009)
 House No. 96 (2020–2021)
 Joint Family
 Kache Ashar Golpo (Season 1; 2011)
 Maya Mosnod
 Mehoman (2021–present)
 Porer Meye (2020–2021)
 Ronger Manush (2004–2005)
 Shohorali (2019-2020)
 Songshar (2016)

Reality
 CloseUp1 (2005-2012)
 Tomakey Khujche Bangladesh

Acquired programming

Animated 
 Chibi Maruko-chan

Drama 
 Kuruluş: Osman
 Marumo no Okite

See also
 List of television stations in Bangladesh

References

External links
 
 NTV Europe

Television channels and stations established in 2003
Television channels in Bangladesh